Lamprogrammus shcherbachevi, the scaleline cusk, is a species of marine ray-finned fish in the family Ophidiidae.

Description
This species is characterized by its elongate body, distinctive series of spines on the preopercle and opercle, and lack of anterior dorsal fin spines.

Etymology
The fish is named in honor of Yuri Nikolayevich Shcherbachev of the Institute of Oceanology, in the Academy of Sciences of the USSR, who was a colleague, a shipmate and the “master of deepsea ichthyology”.

References 

Ophidiidae
Taxa named by Daniel Morris Cohen
Taxa named by Bennie A. Rohr
Animals described in 1993